Luttenberger may refer to:

 Furmint, a variety of grape also known as Luttenberger
 Räuschling, a Swiss wine grape also known as Luttenberger

People with the surname
 Michelle Luttenberger (born 1990), Austrian female singer and half of the duo Luttenberger*Klug
 Peter Luttenberger (born 1972), Austrian professional road bicycle racer